Peter Kenneth Holman MBE (born 19 October 1946, in London) is an English conductor and musicologist best known for reviving the music of Purcell and his English contemporaries. Holman, with the ensemble The Parley of Instruments made many of the extensive series of recordings of lesser-known English baroque music on Hyperion Records in that label's English Orpheus series from 1980 to 2010. The ensemble was co-founded in 1979 by Holman and the violinist Roy Goodman. Holman and the ensemble now record on the Chandos Classics label.

Holman was appointed Member of the Order of the British Empire (MBE) in the 2015 New Year Honours for services to early music.

Publications
 Dowland: Lachrimae (1604) 1999 
 Henry Purcell 1994
 Life After Death: The Viola Da Gamba in Britain 2010
 From Renaissance to Baroque: change in instruments Jonathan Wainwright, Peter Holman, University of York. Dept. of Music - 2005
 Four and twenty fiddlers: the violin at the English court, 1540-1690 - 1996
 Music in the British Provinces, 1690-1914 Rachel Cowgill, Peter Holman - 2007
 Purcell - 23 articles ed. Peter Holman - 2011
 Terpsichore at 400: Michael Praetorius as a Collector of Dances. The Viola da Gamba Society Journal, Volume Six - 2012. pp. 34–51. online

References

English conductors (music)
British male conductors (music)
English musicologists
1946 births
Living people
Members of the Order of the British Empire
21st-century British conductors (music)
21st-century British male musicians
Michael Praetorius scholars